William Alexander Calderhead (September 26, 1844 – December 18, 1928) was a U.S. Representative from Kansas.

Biography
Born on a farm near New Lexington in Perry County, Ohio, Calderhead received private schooling and also attended the common schools and Franklin College in New Athens, Ohio. During the Civil War, he enlisted in August 1862 as a private in Company H, 126th Regiment, Ohio Volunteer Infantry, One Hundred and Twenty-sixth Regiment, Ohio Volunteer Infantry. He was transferred to Company D, Ninth Veteran Reserves, for disability incurred in service and discharged June 27, 1865.

He moved to Harvey County, Kansas, in 1868 and engaged in agricultural pursuits near Newton.  Four years later, he moved into Newton and taught school and studied law. He was admitted to the bar in 1875. He moved to Atchison, and continued to study law. He also engaged in teaching. He settled in Marysville, in 1879 and commenced the practice of law. He served as prosecuting attorney of Marshall County 1889-1891.

Calderhead was elected as a Republican to the Fifty-fourth Congress (March 4, 1895 – March 3, 1897).
He was an unsuccessful candidate for reelection in 1896 to the Fifty-fifth Congress.

Calderhead was elected to the Fifty-sixth and to the five succeeding Congresses (March 4, 1899 – March 3, 1911). He served as chairman of the Committee of Expenditures in the Department of Justice (Fifty-eighth and Fifty-ninth Congresses). He was an unsuccessful candidate for renomination in 1910. He resumed the practice of law in Marysville, Kansas, until 1920, when he retired from active business pursuits and moved to Enid, Oklahoma, where he died on December 18, 1928. He was interred in Marysville Cemetery at Marysville.

Calderhead was the father of Iris Calderhead, a prominent suffragist.

References

Notes

1844 births
1928 deaths
People from New Lexington, Ohio
Union Army soldiers
People from Harvey County, Kansas
Oklahoma Republicans
Republican Party members of the United States House of Representatives from Kansas
People from Marysville, Kansas
People from Atchison, Kansas
Politicians from Enid, Oklahoma